Middleton Regional High School is located in Middleton, Annapolis County, Nova Scotia, Canada. It was founded in 1948 and includes grades 6 - 12. Current and new principal is Ben McNeil. Middleton Regional High School is often abbreviated to MRHS.

The school serves the communities of Middleton, Nictaux, Lawrencetown, Torbrook, Wilmot, Spa Springs, and Margaretsville.

Sports

MRHS has the following sport teams:
Basketball
Badminton
Hockey
Volleyball
Softball
Soccer
Track & Field
Girls Rugby
Since 2010 the teams have been called the Monarchs.

The MRHS Monarchs Senior Girls Basketball team has won four consecutive provincial championships from 2012 to 2016.

Notable alumni
 Merck Mercuriadis, music industry executive

See also
 List of schools in Nova Scotia

References

External links
Middleton Regional High School website

Middle schools in Nova Scotia
High schools in Nova Scotia
Educational institutions established in 1948
Schools in Annapolis County, Nova Scotia
Middleton, Nova Scotia
1948 establishments in Nova Scotia